This is a list of courts in England and Wales. For information about the different types of court see Courts of England and Wales.

Civil courts

The highest appellate court is the Supreme Court of the United Kingdom, followed by the Court of Appeal. The highest court in which originating process may be issued is the High Court of England and Wales. The High Court is based at the Royal Courts of Justice and the Rolls Building in London and in district registries elsewhere.

District registries of the High Court

England

Wales

County Court

When the county court system was created as a result of the County Courts Act 1846, there were 491 county courts in England and Wales.  Since the Crime and Courts Act 2013 came into force, there has been one County Court in England and Wales, sitting simultaneously in many different locations.

Criminal courts

Crown Court

The Crown Court deals with serious criminal charges and with less serious charges where the accused has elected trial at the Crown Court instead of trial at a magistrates' court.  The Crown Court also hears appeals against conviction and sentence from magistrates.  There are 91 locations in England and Wales at which the Crown Court regularly sits.  Crown Court centres are designated in one of three tiers: first-tier centres are visited by High Court judges for criminal and also for civil cases (in the District Registry of the High Court); second-tier centres are visited by High Court judges for criminal work only; and third-tier centres are not normally visited by High Court judges.  High Court judges hear 2% of cases at the Crown Court, but 27% of the most serious (Class 1) cases. Circuit judges and recorders sit at all three tiers, hearing 88% and 10% of the cases respectively. When the Crown Court is conducting a trial, the judge sits with a jury of twelve; when hearing appeals from magistrates, the judge sits with two (or sometimes four) magistrates.

The Crown Court was established by the Courts Act 1971, which came into force on 1 January 1972, following the recommendations of a royal commission chaired by Lord Beeching.  Previously, criminal cases that were not dealt with by magistrates were heard by assizes and quarter sessions, in a system that had changed little in the preceding centuries.  The Crown Court system is administered by His Majesty's Courts and Tribunals Service, an executive agency of the Ministry of Justice.  England is divided into six regions by HMCS (London, Midlands, North East, North West, South East and Western), with the whole of Wales forming a seventh region.

Section 78 of the Supreme Court Act 1981 provides that the Crown Court can conduct business at any location in England and Wales, in accordance with directions given by the Lord Chancellor. This power is sometimes used to enable court sittings to take place away from one of the regular Crown Court venues. For example, in 2007, a sitting of the Crown Court was held at one of the oldest court buildings in England or Wales, the former courthouse in Beaumaris, Anglesey, which was built in 1614 and closed in 1997.

Magistrates' courts

As of 2020:

Former Magistrates' courts

Closed 2010-2020
These courts were shut in the period 2010-2020:

Earlier Closures

Bow Street Magistrates' Court

See also
His Majesty's Courts and Tribunals Service

References

External links
 Find a court (largely England and Wales)

Courts of England and Wales